The Colorado Court of Appeals (Colo. App.) is the intermediate-level appellate court for the state of Colorado.  It was initially established by statute in 1891 and was reestablished in its current form in 1970  by the Colorado General Assembly under Article VI, Section 1 of the Constitution of Colorado.

The Colorado Court of Appeals was first abolished in 1905, then reinstated in 1913, and abolished again in 1917. It has held its modern jurisdiction since 1970.

Jurisdiction
The Court of Appeals has appellate jurisdiction primarily over final judgments of district courts acting as trial courts, and of approximately 33 kinds of administrative agency or board determinations. It is bypassed in the case of death penalty appeals, cases in which a lower court has declared a law or ordinance to be unconstitutional, appeals from Public Utilities Commission decisions, certain appeals related to the initiative process, interlocutory relief, and the further appeal of cases already appealed from a county or municipal court to a district court judge, all of which are appealed directly to the Colorado Supreme Court.

Structure
There is a single geographical division of the Colorado Court of Appeals. The court sits in three-member divisions to decide cases. The chief judge, appointed by the Chief Justice of the Supreme Court, assigns judges to the divisions and rotates their assignments. The Colorado Court of Appeals does not have any internal subject-matter divisions, and it does not have "en banc" review of panel decisions as the federal United States courts of appeals do.

Location

The court is based in Denver, but is authorized to sit in any county seat to hear cases.  The court sends panels once a year to decide cases at the University of Colorado School of Law and the Sturm College of Law at the University of Denver to allow law students to observe the appellate process.

The court has two courtrooms in the Ralph L. Carr Colorado Judicial Center, located at 2 East 14th Avenue in Denver, Colorado.

Administration
This court also has many others employees including support staff, secretaries, law clerks, reporters, and attorneys. There are 105 court employees, including the judges.

The Colorado Court of Appeals has heard more than 100 appellate cases each year since 2012. In the past two decades the state's Court of Appeals has experienced a dramatic increase in both caseload volume and delay. Because of this, case time is measured in terms of months and years.

Judges
The Colorado Court of Appeals, located in Denver, has 22 judges. The judges serve eight-year terms and are subject to retention elections. Each of these judges has his or her own separate chambers located in the Ralph L. Carr Judicial Center.

Chief Judge Gilbert M. Roman
Judge John Daniel Dailey
Judge David M. Furman
Judge Jerry N. Jones
Judge David J. Richman
Judge Terry Fox
Judge Stephanie Dunn
Judge Anthony J. Navarro
Judge Michael H. Berger
Judge Elizabeth L. Harris
Judge Rebecca R. Freyre
Judge Craig R. Welling
Judge Ted C. Tow III
Judge Lino S. Lipinsky de Orlov
Judge Matthew D. Grove
Judge Neeti Vasant Pawar
Judge Jaclyn Casey Brown
Judge Sueanna P. Johnson
Judge Christina F. Gomez
Judge David H. Yun
Judge W. Eric Kuhn
Judge Timothy J. Schutz

References

1. "Columbia Law Review Association, Inc." JSTOR. Columbia Law Review, n.d. Web. 8 Dec. 2014.
2.  Smith, Eduard. "Court of Appeals." Duke Law Review, n.d. Web. 5 July 2013. 
3. Bryson, Elizabeth. "Colorado Judicial Branch - Court of Appeals - Homepage." Colorado Judicial Branch - Court of Appeals - Homepage. Colorado Judicial Branch, n.d. Web. 1 Aug. 2015.

External links
Official homepage of the Colorado Court of Appeals
Procedures and policies of the Court of Appeals

Colorado state courts
State appellate courts of the United States
1891 establishments in Colorado
1905 disestablishments in Colorado
1913 establishments in Colorado
1917 disestablishments in Colorado
1970 establishments in Colorado
Courts and tribunals established in 1891
Courts and tribunals disestablished in 1905
Courts and tribunals established in 1913
Courts and tribunals disestablished in 1917
Courts and tribunals established in 1970